Divinyls (stylised as diVINYLS) is the fourth studio album by Australian band Divinyls, released on 29 January 1991 by Virgin Records. The album was the band's most successful, peaking at number 5 in Australia and number 15 on the US Billboard 200. It also contains the band's biggest-selling single, "I Touch Myself", which reached number one in Australia, number four in the US and number 10 in the UK.

Background and recording
It was the only album recorded by the band with the Virgin Records label after a recording contract with Chrysalis Records in the UK was terminated. Virgin told manager Andrew McManus they were keen to sign the band—by then comprising just singer Chrissy Amphlett and guitarist Mark McEntee—because they saw Amphlett as "the next Madonna". Amphlett and McEntee moved to an apartment in Paris where they wrote "Love School", "Make Out Alright" and "Lay Your Body Down", before transferring to Los Angeles, where the remainder of the album was written, partly in collaboration with songwriters Billy Steinberg and Tom Kelly.

The album was recorded at Jackson Browne's Groove Masters Studio in Santa Monica, with backing provided by bassist Randy Jackson, keyboardist Benmont Tench of Tom Petty and the Heartbreakers and drummer Charley Drayton, who later married Amphlett in 1999.

Promotion
Director Michael Bay filmed a video for "I Touch Myself" in a nunnery in Pasadena. The clip was nominated for an MTV award but in their home country was banned from television.

Critical reception

Jim Farber from Rolling Stone gave praise to the album's instrumentation and lyrical hooks for giving the band more grit and attention to listeners than the "murky production" found on Temperamental. He also highlighted Chrissy Amphlett's vocal performance as another step up from the previous album, calling it "the most sexually charged voice from a rock female" since Chrissie Hynde. Alex Henderson of AllMusic found the record to be "respectable and generally appealing", praising its new wave-influenced tracks for having a sense of edge and melody to them. He added that the band's debut effort Desperate was a better starting point for new listeners but said that this contained more strengths to warrant more attention.

Track listing

Personnel
 Chrissy Amphlett – lead vocals and backing vocals
 Mark McEntee – guitars and backing vocals
 Benmont Tench – piano and organ
 Randy Jackson – bass
 Charley Drayton – drums and harmonica
 Brian McLeod – percussions
 Scott Crago – drums
 Van Dyke Parks – string arrangement ("Love School")

Production
 Produced By Chrissy Amphlett, Mark McEntee & David Tickle
 Recorded by David Tickle and Robert Salcedo, except "Cafe Interlude" (recorded by Jean LeRoc)
 Mixed by Rob Jacobs, Robert Salcedo and Brian Scheuble
 Mastered By Doug Sax
 Tracks 1, 3-8 and 10 published by EMI Songs Ltd.  Track 2 published by Billy Steinberg Music/Denise Barry Music/EMI Songs Ltd.  Track 11 published by Billy Steinberg Music/Denise Barry Music.

Charts

Weekly charts

Year-end charts

Certifications

"Make Out Alright" 

"Make Out Alright" is a song by Australian rock duo Divinyls, released as the third single from their self-titled fourth album in 1991. "Make Out Alright" peaked at No. 105 in Australia.

Track listing
Australian CD single
 "Make Out Alright" - 4:38
 "Need a Lover" - 4:50

Australian 12"/Europe CD single

 "Make Out Alright" - 4:38
 "I Touch Myself" (Live)
 "Need a Lover" - 4:50

References

1990 albums
Divinyls albums
Virgin Records albums